Cameron, Wisconsin may refer to:

 Cameron, Barron County, Wisconsin, a village
 Cameron, Wood County, Wisconsin, a town